There have been 96 modern Winter Olympians who have identified as lesbian, gay, bisexual, transgender, pansexual, non-binary, queer, or who have openly been in a same-sex relationship, including two who have also competed at the Summer Olympic Games. The first Winter Olympic Games in which an athlete now known to be LGBT+ competed was the 1956 Winter Olympics.

The most decorated able-bodied LGBT+ Olympian is Dutch speed skater Ireen Wüst, with 13 medals including 6 golds; Wüst also holds Olympic records. At least 52 LGBT+ Winter Olympians are medalists (54.17% of LGBT+ Winter Olympians), of which 28 have at least one gold medal (29.17%).

Overview

Key 

Tables are default sorted by first Games appearance chronologically, then current surname or common nickname alphabetically, then first name alphabetically. They can be sorted by current surname (where used) or common nickname alphabetically; by country and sport alphabetically; by Games chronologically; and by medals as organised in Olympics medals tables.

Winter Olympic athletes

Notes

References

Sources 

Winter Olympians
LGBT Winter